The 2013–14 Abilene Christian Wildcats women's basketball team represented Abilene Christian University during the 2013–14 NCAA Division I women's basketball season. The Wildcats were led by second year head coach Julie Goodenough and played their home games at the Moody Coliseum. They were new members of the Southland Conference. Since this was the first year of a 4-year transition phase from D2 to D1, Abilene Christian could not participate in the Southland Tournament nor the NCAA Tournament.  They played each conference foe only once, with the exception of Incarnate Word. The Wildcats would have been able to participate in the WNIT or WBI tournaments if they had been invited.

Roster

Schedule
Source

|-
!colspan=9| Regular Season

See also
2013–14 Abilene Christian Wildcats men's basketball team

References

Abilene Christian Wildcats women's basketball seasons
Abilene Christian
Abilene Christian Wildcats basketball
Abilene Christian Wildcats basketball